Robert David Farquhar (23 February 1872 – 6 December 1967) was an architect working in California from 1905 to 1940.

Early life
Farquhar was born in Brooklyn, the son of  David Webber Farquhar (1844–1905)  and Sarah Malvina Joslyn.  He attended Phillips Exeter and Harvard (class of 1893). Farquhar completed an architectural degree at the Massachusetts Institute of Technology (1893–1895), and then attended École des Beaux-Arts in Paris (1896–1901), where he organized the first ever American football game played in Europe. He returned to New York and worked in the office of Hunt & Hunt, and of Carrère and Hastings.

Los Angeles practice
Farquhar moved to Los Angeles in 1905 and practised architecture there. He was appointed a member of the architectural commission of the Panama-Pacific Exposition, held in San Francisco in 1915, and designed Festival Hall.  He went to Italy with the American Red Cross in 1918, and re-opened his office in Los Angeles in 1919.  The Southern California Chapter of the American Institute of Architects awarded Farquhar its Distinguished Honor Award for the William Andrews Clark Mausoleum, and Certificates of Honor for the design of the William Andrews Clark Memorial Library and the California Club.  He worked with chief architect George Edwin Bergstrom on design of the Pentagon in 1941. The archives of his architectural studies and drawings are maintained at the UCLA Department of Special Collections.

Some projects

Family life
Farquhar married Marion Jones (daughter of  John Percival Jones) in New York City, in 1903. They had three children: David Farquhar (1904 - ),  John Percival Farquhar (1912 - ) and Colin Farquhar (1913 - ). The family lived first in Santa Monica, then moved to Pasadena in 1929. Farquhar retired in 1953 and lived with his half brother Francis P. Farquhar in Berkeley.

References

1872 births
1967 deaths
American neoclassical architects
Beaux Arts architects
Mediterranean Revival architects
Spanish Revival architects
Architects from Pasadena, California
American alumni of the École des Beaux-Arts
Harvard University alumni
MIT School of Architecture and Planning alumni
Phillips Exeter Academy alumni
20th-century American architects